Yıldız Technical University (Tr. Yıldız Teknik Üniversitesi, often simply referred to as YTU or Yıldız) is a prominent technical university dedicated to engineering and natural sciences, as well as social sciences recently, and is one of the oldest educational institutions in Istanbul, Turkey. The central campus lies within the Beşiktaş district and the new  lies within the Esenler district. The university is composed of ten faculties, three vocational schools, and two institutions.

History

Yıldız Technical University has a distinguished history that dates to 1911. YTU was founded as Kondüktör Mekteb-i Âlisi (Conductors School of Higher Education) in order to meet the "science officer" (known previously as conductors, and today as technicians) needs of the Municipality Public Works Section. The school was modeled on the syllabus of the "Ecole de Conducteur" and was affiliated with the Ministry of Public Works. The school's name was changed to Nafia Fen Mektebi (School of Public Works) in 1922. The duration of education was increased to two and a half years in 1926 and three years in 1931.

Following the increase in public facilities and the requirement for technical services, a ruling ordered the closure of Nafia Fen Mektebi and the establishment of a Technical School to supply the workforce for the gap between technical officers and professional engineers. The school provided a two-year program for technical officers and a four-year program for engineers. Buildings were granted from the Yıldız Palace annexes, which are still in use today.

In the early period, the school consisted of civil and mechanical departments, educating students as technical officers and engineers. Starting with the 1942-1943 semester, electrical and architecture departments were added as part of the Department of Engineering. The school was established as an autonomous higher education and research institution in 1969. With a law which ruled for the closing of special vocational schools in 1971, engineering schools were affiliated with the Istanbul State Engineering and Architectural Academy.

Campuses history

Yıldız University was formed by the merger of the Istanbul State Engineering and Architectural Academy along with affiliated schools of engineering, and related faculties and departments of the Kocaeli State Engineering and Architecture Academy together with the Kocaeli Vocational School. The new university incorporated a Science Institute, a Social Sciences Institute, and the departments of Science-Literature and Engineering, Foreign Languages, Turkish Language, Atatürk Principles & the History of Revolution, Physical Education and Fine Arts.

The university took its final name in 1992 as Yıldız Technical University. The Faculty of Engineering was divided into four faculties and restructured as: Faculty of Electrical-Electronics, Faculty of Construction, Faculty of Mechanical and Chemical-Metallurgy, and Faculty of Economics and Administrative Sciences. The Kocaeli Faculty of Engineering and the Kocaeli Vocational School were separated from the university to be restructured as Kocaeli University.

Faculties
Faculty of Electric and Electronics 
Faculty of Literature and National Culture Studies
Faculty of Arts & Sciences
Faculty of Art and Design 
Faculty of Education
Faculty of Economic and Administrative Sciences  
Faculty of Civil Engineering  
Faculty of Chemical and Metallurgical Engineering 
Faculty of Mechanical Engineering 
Faculty of Naval Architecture and Maritime 
Faculty of Architecture
Faculty of Applied Sciences

Institutes and schools
Institute of Science and Engineering
Institute of Social Sciences
School of Vocational Studies
School of Foreign Languages

Affiliations
The university is a member of the Caucasus University Association.

Rankings 

In 2018, Times Higher Education ranked the university top 1000 in the world.

In the QS World University Rankings 2020, YTU is ranked at 351-400th in the subject areas "Electrical & Electronics Engineering" and "Mechanical, Aeronautical & Manufacturing Engineering". In "Physics & Astronomy", YTU attained 501-550th position. Moreover, in the broad subject area of "Engineering & Technology", YTU stands at 451-500th place worldwide.

In the Academic Ranking of World Universities 2019, YTU is ranked at 201-300th in the subject area "Civil Engineering", 301-400th in the subject area "Mechanical Engineering", and 401-500th in the subject areas "Physics" and "Chemical Engineering".

The Best Global Universities Ranking of the U.S. News & World Report ranks YTU 769th in the world and 292nd in the subject area "Engineering" as of 2019.

By CWTS Leiden Ranking 2019, YTU is ranked 762nd (overall), 450th in the subject area "Physical Sciences and Engineering" and 422nd in the subject area "Mathematics and Computer Science".

By URAP 2018, Yildiz Technical University is ranked 868th (overall) and 461st in the subject area "Engineering".

By Round University Ranking 2019, YTU is ranked 660st in the world, 529th in the "Technical Sciences" and 598th in the "Natural Sciences".

Notable faculty
Oktay Sinanoğlu
Şirin Pancaroğlu

Notable alumni
See also Yıldız Technical University alumni for the detailed list.

Ayşegül Abadan
Tarık Akan
Ali Coşkun
Hasan Doğan
Fuat Güner
Kenan İmirzalıoğlu
Fikret Orman
Kazim Öz
Yiğit Özşener
İlhan Şen
Ahu Türkpençe
Murat Yildirim - Actor
Alp Navruz - Actor
Ceylan Ertem
Nejat İşler
Ertuğrul Sağlam

Gallery

See also

Technical university
Turkish universities

References

External links

YTU Official Page 
YTU Official English Page

 
Engineering universities and colleges in Turkey
Technical universities and colleges in Turkey
Educational institutions established in 1911
Beşiktaş
1911 establishments in the Ottoman Empire